Veikkausliiga is the premier division of Finnish football, comprising the top 12 clubs of the country.  Veikkausliiga is ranked as the 28th best league in Europe. Its main sponsor is the Finnish national betting agency Veikkaus, hence the league's name. Veikkausliiga was founded in 1990; before that the top division was called Mestaruussarja (championship series) since 1930 which was an amateur or semi-professional league.

Overview
It was contested by 12 teams, and KuPS Kuopio won the championship.

League standings

Results

References
Finland - List of final tables (RSSSF)

Mestaruussarja seasons
Fin
Fin
1